WBIZ-FM (100.7 MHz, "Z100") is a Top 40 (CHR) radio station in Eau Claire, Wisconsin. The station is currently owned by iHeartMedia. The station signed on in 1967. It is known as Z100. The studios are located in Eau Claire while the transmitter is located near County Highway T and 60th Ave north of Eau Claire.

The station airs programming from iHeartMedia's Premiere Networks such as On Air with Ryan Seacrest, On the Move with Enrique Santos, Most Requested Live with Romeo, American Top 40, iHeartRadio Countdown, and The Vibe with Tanya and EJ.

WBIZ-FM also serves as Eau Caire's radio home of the Green Bay Packers and Wisconsin Badgers football.

References

External links
Z100

Contemporary hit radio stations in the United States
BIZ-FM
Radio stations established in 1967
IHeartMedia radio stations